Ildemaro is a given name. Notable people with the name include:

 Ildemaro Fernández (born 1961), Venezuelan footballer
 Ildemaro Sánchez (born 1954), Venezuelan fencer and Olympian
 Ildemaro Vargas (born 1991), Venezuelan baseball player